Josh Shaw may refer to:

 Josh Shaw (defensive tackle) (born 1979), former American football defensive tackle
 Josh Shaw (defensive back) (born 1992), American football cornerback
 Josh Shaw (cricketer) (born 1996), English cricketer